
Gmina Kolbuszowa is an urban-rural gmina (administrative district) in Kolbuszowa County, Subcarpathian Voivodeship, in south-eastern Poland.

Villages
Apart from the town of Kolbuszowa, Gmina Kolbuszowa contains the villages and settlements of Brzezówka, Bukowiec, Domatków, Huta Przedborska, Kłapówka, Kolbuszowa Dolna, Kolbuszowa Górna, Kupno, Nowa Wieś, Poręby Kupieńskie, Przedbórz, Świerczów, Werynia, Widełka and Zarębki.

Neighbouring gminas
Gmina Kolbuszowa is bordered by the gminas of Cmolas, Dzikowiec, Głogów Małopolski, Niwiska, Raniżów, Sędziszów Małopolski and Świlcza.

References
Polish official population figures 2006

External links

Kolbuszowa
Kolbuszowa County